"By Myself" is a 1937 jazz standard. It was written by Arthur Schwartz and Howard Dietz. 
The song was first sung by Jack Buchanan in the show "Between the Devil" (1937) and was a musical number in the  1953 musical comedy film, The Band Wagon.

Notable Recordings

Mabel Mercer – Songs by Mabel Mercer, Vol. 2 (1953)
Barbara Carroll Trio – Lullabies in Rhythm (1954)
Lee Wiley and Ellis Larkins – Duologue: Lee Wiley Sings Rogers & Hart; Ellis Larkins Plays Piano Solos (1954)
Art Farmer – Farmer's Market (1956)
Patty McGovern – Wednesday's Child (1956), arranged by Thomas Talbert
Helen Merrill – Dream of You (1956), arranged by Gil Evans
Sammy Davis Jr. – Sammy Swings (1957)
Judy Garland – Alone (1957), arranged by Gordon Jenkins; I Could Go On Singing (Original Motion Picture Soundtrack) (1963)
Gogi Grant – Granted It's Gogi (1957), arranged by Johnny Mandel
Jerry Lewis – Jerry Lewis Just Sings (1957), arranged by Buddy Bregman
Johnny Mathis – Warm (1957), arranged by Percy Faith
Ruth Price – The Party's Over (1957)
Freddie Redd – San Francisco Suite (1957)
Mal Waldron – Mal/3: Sounds (1958)
Tony Bennett – Hometown, My Town (1959), arranged by Ralph Burns; Steppin' Out (1993)
Carmen McRae – Book of Ballads (1959), arranged by Frank Hunter
Teresa Brewer – Ridin' High (1960), arranged by Jerry Fielding
Shirley Scott – Hip Soul (1961)
Fred Astaire – Three Evenings with Fred Astaire (1962), arranged by David Rose
Shelley Manne and Jack Marshall – Sounds Unheard Of (1962)
Lena Horne – Lena Like Latin (1963), arranged by Shorty Rogers
Doc Severinsen – Torch Songs for Trumpet (1963)
Jack Jones – Where Love Has Gone (1964)
Julie London – In Person at the Americana (1964), arranged by Don Bagley
Esther Ofarim - Is it really me? (1965), arranged and produced by Bobby Scott
Don Shirley – Water Boy (1965)
Cher – Bittersweet White Light (1973)
Dave McKenna – By Myself (1976), "Dancing in the Dark" and Other Music of Arthur Schwartz (1986), and Fresh Air in Concert (1990)
Shirley Horn – A Lazy Afternoon (1978)
Roger Kellaway – Say That Again (1978)
James Williams – Flying Colors (1978)
Cal Collins – By Myself (1980)
Johnny Hartman – Once in Every Life (1981)
Maxine Sullivan – Maxine Sullivan With the Ike Isaacs Quintet (1981); On Tour With the Allegheny Jazz Quartet: Starring Maxine Sullivan (1984); Uptown (1985, with the Scott Hamilton Quintet)
Buddy De Franco and Oscar Peterson – Hark: Buddy De Franco Meets the Oscar Peterson Quartet (1985), with Joe Pass and Niels-Henning Ørsted Pedersen
Ella Fitzgerald and Joe Pass – Easy Living (1986)
Barney Kessel – Red, Hot and Blues (1988)
Joe Pass – Blues for Fred (1988)
Junior Cook – On a Misty Night (1990)
Trudy Desmond – Tailor Made (1992), arranged by Roger Kellaway
Stephanie Nakasian – Bitter Sweet (1992)
Lou Levy – By Myself (1995)
Gary Lemel – Moonlighting (1999), arranged by Roger Kellaway
Paul Smoker – Standard Deviations (1999)
Claudia Schmidt – I Thought About You: A Jazz Collection (2001)
Cleo Laine – Quality Time (2002), arranged by John Dankworth
Susie Arioli – Learn to Smile Again (2005)
Herb Geller –  Herb Geller Plays the Arthur Schwartz Songbook (2005)
Stevie Holland – More Than Words Can Say (2006)
Meredith D'Ambrosio – By Myself (2012)
Cecile McLorin Salvant – The Window'' (2018)

See also
List of jazz standards

References

1930s jazz standards
1937 songs